Thomas Charles Fell (born 17 October 1993) is an English cricketer who plays for Worcestershire. He is a right-handed batsman and occasional wicket-keeper.

Tom Fell was educated at Oakham School, where he was the highest run scorer in the school's history. He went on to study at Oxford Brookes University, and played for Oxford MCCU. He left university after a year to focus on cricket.

After the end of the 2015 season, it was confirmed that Fell was suffering from testicular cancer, but after initially being cleared to play grade cricket in Australia, a scan subsequently detected the disease in his lymph nodes and Fell returned to home to undergo chemotherapy. After receiving the all-clear Fell returned to cricket in July 2016 with a half century against Leicestershire.

He made his Twenty20 debut for Worcestershire in the 2018 t20 Blast on 17 August 2018.

References

External links
 

1993 births
English cricketers
Worcestershire cricketers
Living people
People from Hillingdon
English cricketers of the 21st century
Oxford MCCU cricketers
Wicket-keepers